The 2007 Players Championship was a golf tournament in Florida on the PGA Tour, held  at TPC Sawgrass in Ponte Vedra Beach, southeast of Jacksonville. It was the 34th Players Championship and was won by Phil Mickelson, two strokes ahead of runner-up Sergio García.

With the new PGA Tour season arrangement in 2007, the tournament was played in May for the first time and concluded on Mother's Day. Previous tournaments were typically played in late March, two weeks before the Masters Tournament.

Defending champion Stephen Ames missed the 36-hole cut by seven strokes.

Venue

This was the 26th Players Championship held at the TPC at Sawgrass Stadium Course in Ponte Vedra Beach, Florida.

Course layout

Field
Robert Allenby, Stephen Ames, Billy Andrade, Stuart Appleby, Woody Austin, Eric Axley, Paul Azinger, Aaron Baddeley, Briny Baird, Rich Beem, Shane Bertsch, Jason Bohn, David Branshaw, Olin Browne, Bart Bryant, Jonathan Byrd, Mark Calcavecchia, Chad Campbell, Michael Campbell, Paul Casey, K. J. Choi, Daniel Chopra, Stewart Cink, Tim Clark, Darren Clarke, José Cóceres, Chris Couch, Ben Curtis, Brian Davis, Chris DiMarco, Luke Donald, Ken Duke, Joe Durant, Steve Elkington, Ernie Els, Bob Estes, Niclas Fasth, Steve Flesch, Harrison Frazar, Fred Funk, Jim Furyk, Sergio García, Robert Garrigus, Brian Gay, Lucas Glover, Mathew Goggin, Retief Goosen, Jason Gore, Jeff Gove, Paul Goydos, Nathan Green, Mathias Grönberg, Bill Haas, Todd Hamilton, Pádraig Harrington, J. P. Hayes, J. J. Henry, Tim Herron, Charley Hoffman, J. B. Holmes, Charles Howell III, David Howell, Ryuji Imada, Trevor Immelman, Freddie Jacobson, Richard S. Johnson, Zach Johnson, Kent Jones, Robert Karlsson, Jerry Kelly, Anthony Kim, Cliff Kresge, Doug LaBelle II, Bernhard Langer, Stephen Leaney, Tom Lehman, Justin Leonard, Frank Lickliter, Peter Lonard, Davis Love III, Steve Lowery, Will MacKenzie, Jeff Maggert, Hunter Mahan, John Mallinger, Steve Marino, Daisuke Maruyama, Shigeki Maruyama, Troy Matteson, Billy Mayfair, Rocco Mediate, Shaun Micheel, Phil Mickelson, Colin Montgomerie, Ryan Moore, Sean O'Hair, Nick O'Hern, Arron Oberholser, Joe Ogilvie, Geoff Ogilvy, José María Olazábal, Greg Owen, Ryan Palmer, Rod Pampling, Jesper Parnevik, Corey Pavin, Pat Perez, Craig Perks, Tom Pernice Jr., Kenny Perry, Carl Pettersson, Ian Poulter, Ted Purdy, Brett Quigley, Jeff Quinney, John Rollins, Rory Sabbatini, Charl Schwartzel, Adam Scott, John Senden, Joey Sindelar, Vijay Singh, Heath Slocum, Jeff Sluman, Brandt Snedeker, Henrik Stenson, Steve Stricker, Kevin Sutherland, Vaughn Taylor, David Toms, D. J. Trahan, Kirk Triplett, Bo Van Pelt, Scott Verplank, Camilo Villegas, Bobby Wadkins, Charles Warren, Nick Watney, Bubba Watson, Boo Weekley, Mike Weir, Brett Wetterich, Dean Wilson, Mark Wilson, Tiger Woods

Round summaries

First round
Thursday, May 10, 2007

In gusty winds, a record 50 balls found the water at the 17th hole, which broke the single-round tournament record of 45 set 

Source

Second round
Friday, May 11, 2007

Source

Third round
Saturday, May 12, 2007

Source:

Final round
Sunday, May 13, 2007

Phil Mickelson won his first Players Championship after shooting a final round 69 to pass 54-hole leader Sean O'Hair. Mickelson birdied his first two holes and made his lone bogey at the 18th hole after the tournament was locked up. O'Hair was two strokes behind Mickelson as they headed to the infamous par-3 17th hole, but he hit two balls in the water going after the tucked pin on the island green for a quadruple bogey. O'Hair also bogeyed the final hole, and the mistakes dropped him from second to eleventh place, costing him $747,000 in prize money.

Scorecard

Cumulative tournament scores, relative to par
{|class="wikitable" span = 50 style="font-size:85%;
|-
|style="background: Pink;" width=10|
|Birdie
|style="background: PaleGreen;" width=10|
|Bogey
|style="background: Green;" width=10|
|Double bogey
|style="background: Olive;" width=10|
|Triple bogey+
|}
Source:

References

External links
The Players Championship website

2007
2007 in golf
2007 in American sports
2007 in sports in Florida
May 2007 sports events in the United States